2146 Stentor  is a Jupiter trojan from the Greek camp, approximately  in diameter. It was discovered on 24 October 1976, by Danish astronomer Richard Martin West at the ESO's La Silla Observatory in Chile. The dark Jovian asteroid has a rotation period of 16.4 hours and belongs to the 100 largest Jupiter trojans. It was named after Stentor from Greek mythology, a Herald of the Greeks during the Trojan War.

Orbit and classification 

Stentor is a Jovian asteroid orbiting in the leading Greek camp at Jupiter's  Lagrangian point, 60° ahead of the gas giant's orbit in a 1:1 resonance . It is a non-family asteroid in the Jovian background population.

It orbits the Sun at a distance of 4.7–5.7 AU once every 11 years and 10 months (4,327 days; semi-major axis of 5.2 AU). Its orbit has an eccentricity of 0.10 and an inclination of 39° with respect to the ecliptic. The body's observation arc begins with its official discovery observation at La Silla in October 1976.

Physical characteristics 

Stentor is an assumed C-type asteroid.

Rotation period 

In June 2016, a rotational lightcurve of Stentor was obtained from photometric observations by Brian Warner at the Center for Solar System Studies (CS3) in California. Lightcurve analysis gave a rotation period of  hours with a brightness amplitude of 0.10 magnitude. An alternative period solution (1:1.5 alias of 24.88 was also obtained.

Stentor was previously observed at CS3 by Daniel Coley and Robert Stephens in February 2013, gave an alternative period solution of  hours with an amplitude of 0.09 magnitude. This approximately a 1:2 alias is now superseded by the shorter period above.

Diameter and albedo 

According to the survey carried out by the NEOWISE mission of NASA's Wide-field Infrared Survey Explorer, Stentor measures 50.76 kilometers in diameter and its surface has an albedo 0.082, while the Collaborative Asteroid Lightcurve Link assumes a standard albedo for a carbonaceous asteroid of 0.057 and calculates a diameter of 58.29 kilometers based on an absolute magnitude of 9.9.

Naming 

This minor planet was named from Greek mythology after Stentor, the Greek warrior and herald with a voice as loud as fifty men together. The official  was published by the Minor Planet Center on 1 July 1979.

Notes

References

External links 
 Asteroid Lightcurve Database (LCDB), query form (info )
 Dictionary of Minor Planet Names, Google books
 Discovery Circumstances: Numbered Minor Planets (1)-(5000) – Minor Planet Center
 Small Bodies Data Ferret at the Asteroid 2146 Stentor
 
 

002146
Discoveries by Richard Martin West
Named minor planets
19761024